The Bird's Nest is a 1954 novel by Shirley Jackson. The plot concerns a young woman, Elizabeth Richmond, with multiple personality disorder.

Writing and background
While writing The Bird's Nest, Jackson suffered from insomnia, backaches, and paranoia, symptoms similar to those the main character of the novel is afflicted with. She took a break from writing the novel in the summer of 1953, but the symptoms returned when she continued writing the book that fall.

Plot
Each chapter of the novel follows a specific character. Chapter One follows Elizabeth, a shy, rather colorless young woman who lives with her Aunt Morgen and works as a secretary at a local museum. She frequently suffers from headaches, backaches, and insomnia, but no one knows the reason. Elizabeth begins receiving threatening, handwritten letters addressing her as "Dirty Dirty Lizzy." One morning, Morgen accuses Elizabeth of sneaking out of the house at night; Elizabeth insists that she has no memory of doing so. Aunt Morgen continues to be suspicious, eventually deciding to take her to a doctor when Elizabeth makes some initially-unspecified vulgar comments during dinner at a dinner party hosted by the Arrows, friends of Morgen's. The doctor is unable to help Elizabeth, but refers her to Doctor Wright, a psychiatrist whom he believes could be of help.

The next chapter follows Doctor Wright. He first interviews Elizabeth and gains her trust, eventually convincing her to submit to hypnosis so he can better understand her problem. During his second attempt, he encounters two of Elizabeth's alter personalities: Beth, a calm and friendly girl; and Betsy, who is childlike and whom Dr. Wright initially believes to be a demon. He is able to procure some minor details as to Elizabeth's mother's whereabouts (and finds out she had died several years before), which he believes to be the root of the problem. Betsy begins threatening to take over Elizabeth, and manages to one night. Dr. Wright, whom Betsy refuses to answer until he identifies himself as "Dr. Wrong," believes that he's subdued her, and agrees to let her be in control for a day. He then tries to summon Beth to tell her to fight Betsy's impulses, but instead speaks to Betsy pretending to be Beth. He rushes home and types a letter of resignation to Aunt Morgen. Before he has a chance to send it, he gets a call from Morgen informing him that Elizabeth has run away from home.

The third chapter focuses on Betsy, who takes a bus to New York City, where she believes she will find her mother. While on the bus, Betsy has flashbacks and recalls an event in which she went to the beach with her mother and Robin, her mother's then-boyfriend. While at the beach, she overhears Robin telling her mother that he hates Elizabeth and wishes she'd stayed at home with Morgen; unable to remember how her mother responded, Betsy tells herself that her mother defended her. Once she has returned to reality and exited the bus, she gets a hotel room and goes to a restaurant, briefly befriending a man whom she eats with. It is revealed that he is a doctor, and Betsy, convinced that he is Dr. Wright in disguise, flees the restaurant. She then boards a city bus, and informs a female passenger that she is searching for her mother. The woman, going by a description Betsy gives of the home, suggests that she look on the West Side. Betsy obeys, but continually runs into people whom she believes to be enemies from her past. Beth and Elizabeth occasionally take control of her, climaxing when Elizabeth manages to overpower Betsy and render her unconscious. Elizabeth wakes up in a hospital, with her fourth personality, Bess, in charge for the first time in the novel.

The fourth chapter is narrated from the perspective of Doctor Wright again. He calls Elizabeth to his office once she is discharged from the hospital, and attempts to get information about why she went to the city. Bess, the alter now at the helm of Elizabeth's personality, is uncooperative, and discusses little except her money and her hatred for her aunt, whom she believes wants to steal it. Betsy sometimes takes control of Elizabeth, and often plays practical jokes on Bess, but Bess grows more and more powerful. Eventually, Betsy resorts to controlling what Bess writes. Bess, who is frightened because she insists she's not doing the writing herself, refuses to believe that it is she who is writing. Instead, she blames Dr. Wright and insists that it must be a magic trick. Dr. Wright writes a note to Elizabeth's aunt, asking her to phone him, but receives a reply the next day, berating him for a vulgar note. Dr. Wright figures out that Betsy rewrote the note to scare off her aunt. When questioned about her motive, Betsy confesses that she is unsure why she doesn't want Dr. Wright to contact her aunt. Eventually, through a phone call, the Doctor is able to schedule an appointment with Aunt Morgen to discuss the condition of her niece. The meeting starts off well, but Aunt Morgen becomes intoxicated, and begins shouting at the doctor. As he prepares to leave, Bess returns home, and announces that she wants both Doctor Wright and Aunt Morgen out of her life. Doctor Wright storms off and vows to never work with Elizabeth again.

The fifth chapter follows Aunt Morgen. She wakes up hungover the next morning, and talks with Betsy when she comes downstairs. After a short conversation in which Betsy tries to get Morgen to say she likes her best, Morgen heads upstairs to take a nap. When she wakes up and goes downstairs later, she finds her refrigerator full of mud. She then returns to bed again, waking late in the afternoon. That night, she yells at Elizabeth and, feeling guilty, offers to let her use some of her new bath salts in a warm bath. Elizabeth obliges, but when she gets out, she has changed to Beth, who wants to take her bath, then Bess, then finally Betsy, who uses the last of the bath salts. The next morning, fed up with Bess's insolence (after Bess orders several items from a department store to be delivered to the house), Morgen calls Doctor Wright and convinces him to come to the house and straighten out Elizabeth once and for all. When he arrives, Bess attempts to fight Morgen and keep her away from the door, but Morgen manages to defeat her, and lets Doctor Wright in. She explains to Betsy and the Doctor the complete circumstances regarding Elizabeth's mother's death. Heartbroken, Elizabeth declares, "I am going to close my eyes now and you will never see me again" as each of her fractured personalities vacates her body.

The sixth and final chapter is narrated from a third person perspective instead of following a specific character. Having absorbed, or "eaten" all of her previous identities, Elizabeth is given a new name by Doctor Wright and her aunt: "Victoria Morgen." Along with Aunt Morgen and Doctor Wright, Elizabeth, or "Victoria," re-visits the Arrows' home, where she goes into the garden and stares at the sky. They leave, and Victoria announces, "I'm happy...I know who I am."

Critical reception
The novel initially garnered lukewarm reviews from critics, some of whom felt that Elizabeth's personalities were too simple. Kirkus Book Reviews was more positive, however, commenting that, while the story could be quite unusual, that for "a special audience, an exploratory of precarious and unpredictable variations, this has a certain fascination."

More recently, however, the book has become the subject of more positive reviews. Flavorwire praised the novel, commenting that it "displays Shirley Jackson’s groundbreaking narrative abilities," and calling the novel "a masterwork of psychological fiction, and one that deserves as much attention as Jackson’s more popular writings." The New York Times praised the book as a "dryly unsettling [...] novel". The Book Wheel Blog awarded the novel 3 out of 5 stars and felt that it "has all of the classic Shirley Jackson hallmarks, including family mysteries and twisted rivalries."

Release
In 2014, Penguin Publishing reprinted the novel, along with Jackson's 1958 work The Sundial.

Film adaptation

A film adaptation of the book, titled Lizzie, was filmed in 1957 and released the following year. It was directed by Hugo Haas and starred Eleanor Parker as the titular character. The film was a modest success, grossing more than $500,000 at the box office with a $361,000 budget, but Jackson reportedly disliked the movie, particularly its portrayal of Aunt Morgen as a flirtatious floozy rather than the caring and steady woman depicted in the book. She described the film as "Abbott and Costello meet a multiple personality."

References

1954 American novels
Novels by Shirley Jackson
Novels about mental health
Books by Shirley Jackson
American novels adapted into films
Dissociative identity disorder in popular culture